Dasypodia is a genus of moths of the family Erebidae. The genus was erected by Achille Guenée in 1852.

Species
 Dasypodia cymatodes Guenée, 1852 – northern old lady moth
 Dasypodia selenophora Guenée, 1852 – southern old lady moth

References

Erebinae